Robin Charles Moreton Harper,  (born 4 August 1940) is a Scottish politician, who was a Member of the Scottish Parliament (MSP) for the Lothians region (1999–2011). He was co-convener of the Scottish Greens (2004–2008). Harper became an MSP in the first elections to the Scottish Parliament in 1999, the first ever elected Green parliamentarian in the United Kingdom.

Early life and career
Harper was born in Thurso, Caithness. He was educated at St Marylebone Grammar School and Elgin Academy, Moray. He graduated from the University of Aberdeen in 1962. He worked as an English teacher in Kenya, then a Modern Studies teacher at Boroughmuir High School, Edinburgh.

Harper was a member of Lothian Children's Panel 1985–1988 and Lothian Health Council 1993–1998.

Political career
Harper joined the Ecology Party's Scottish branch in 1985.  At the time, the branch only had 35 members, and its AGM that year was held in his flat. He was elected unopposed as its convenor and secretary, and remained a leading figure as it became first the UK-wide Green Party, then the independent Scottish Greens.

He stood, unsuccessfully, as a Green candidate in the 1995 Perth and Kinross by-election, and for Edinburgh Pentlands in the 1997 United Kingdom general election, finishing seventh and sixth respectively.

Scottish Parliament 
Harper stood for election at the first ever Scottish Parliament election in 1999, and was elected as an additional member for the Lothians region, becoming the first ever elected Green Party parliamentarian in British political history. In an emotional speech, he promised to be a critical voice on the environment in the newly created devolved Parliament. He criticised the Scottish Executive's decision to split ministerial responsibility for the environment in 2001. He served as his party's sole representative in the first Parliament (1999–2003) until the 2003 election, when the Scottish Green Party won another 6 seats in the regional lists. Harper was sworn in by giving the formal affirmation, also adding: "On behalf of the Scottish Green Party I wish to affirm that our priority will be to serve the people of Scotland who are sovereign in this land." He was the party's spokesman on education and young people. In 2004, he was a member of the Scottish Parliament team in the TV general knowledge show University Challenge: The Professionals. He and fellow team members Richard Baker (Labour), Stewart Stevenson (SNP) and Jamie Stone (Lib Dem) who was captain, beat a Welsh Assembly team by 110 points to 75.

In January 2007, The Scotsman reported that Harper was being considered for the next Presiding Officer of the Scottish Parliament. Harper stated that he did not know of this story, but said "it would be an honour even to be considered". Following the 2007 elections to the Scottish Parliament, Harper was returned as a list MSP for the Lothians, this time one of only two Green Party members elected. After an agreement with the Scottish National Party, the party with the largest mandate from the election, the Green MSPs including Harper voted for Alex Salmond to become First Minister of Scotland but the Greens declined to enter a formal coalition with the Scottish National Party. As part of the deal, fellow Green MSP Patrick Harvie was nominated to head the Holyrood Transport, Infrastructure and Climate Change Committee. In 2009, Harper and Harvie voted to reject an SNP government budget. He did not seek re-election in 2011.

After Parliament
Dear Mr. Harper, Harper's autobiography written with journalist Fred Bridgland, was published in 2011.

In September 2014, Harper became chairman of the Scottish Wildlife Trust. He remained in that role for three years.

At the beginning of December 2013, Harper announced that he would "absolutely vote no" in the 2014 referendum on Scottish independence, going on to say that he would be happy to help the Better Together campaign and that there was a "significant minority" of Greens who were opposed to independence.

In August 2021, Harper criticised the deal that the Greens had struck with Nicola Sturgeon's government, claiming that his party had failed to take tougher action on North Sea oil, marine protection and taxation.

In September 2022, he joined the board of Gordon Brown's unionist think tank, Our Scottish Future.

Patronage
Harper has been a patron of many organisations including LGBT Youth Scotland, an organisation dedicated to the inclusion and advancement of the rights of lesbian, gay, bisexual and transgender young people in Scotland. He was an Honorary Vice-President of English-Speaking Union Scotland. He served as Rector of the University of Edinburgh 2000–2003. Harper was an Honorary President of the Edinburgh University Savoy Opera Group. He was elected as Rector of the University of Aberdeen in 2005.

He was President of the Royal Scottish Society of Arts 2008–2011.

References

External links
 
 Robin Harper – MSP for the Lothians website that was in use from 2006–2008

1940 births
Living people
Scottish Green Party MSPs
Alumni of the University of Aberdeen
Rectors of the University of Edinburgh
Rectors of the University of Aberdeen
Scottish schoolteachers
Leaders of the Scottish Green Party
People from Thurso
Scottish pacifists
Members of the Scottish Parliament 1999–2003
Members of the Scottish Parliament 2003–2007
Members of the Scottish Parliament 2007–2011
People educated at Elgin Academy, Moray